The College of Medallists is an association of recipients of The Sir Misha Black Medal for Distinguished Services in Design Education. Misha Black (1910–1977) was a pioneer of design in Britain. The College of Medallists was established in 2000, and joined the Founding Bodies (the Design and Industries Association, the Royal College of Art (RCA), the Faculty of Royal Designers for Industry (RDI) at the Royal Society of Arts (RSA), and the Royal Academy of Engineering) in supporting the Sir Misha Black Awards. In 2020, the College of Medallists became part of the Royal Commission for the Exhibition of 1851, with the Imperial College of London as a founding body.

Sir Misha Black Awards Committee
The Sir Misha Black Awards Committee comprises:
 Mary V. Mullin (chairman) – Design and Industries Association
 Professor Peter Childs, FREng, FIMechE, FASME – Imperial College London
 Professor Sir Christopher Frayling – College of Medallists
 Professor Malcolm Garrett MBE RDI FISTD – RSA Faculty of Royal Designers for Industry  
 Professor Geoffrey Kirk RDI FREng – Royal Academy of Engineering
 Professor Chris Wise, RDI, FREng - Royal Commission for the Exhibition of 1851
 Dr Nick de Leon – Co-opted Member

Medal recipients

References

External links 
  The Sir Misha Black Awards

Design awards